Cymindis asiabadensis is a species of ground beetle in the subfamily Harpalinae. It was described by Jedlicka in 1961.

References

asiabadensis
Beetles described in 1961